Desis marina, the intertidal spider, is a spider species found in New Zealand, New Caledonia, and the Chatham Islands.

It was first described by James Hector in 1878.

Taxonomy 
Previously, specimens of Desis marina had been misidentified as Dandrigea dysderoides in 1849. In 1877, it was described for the first time as Argyroneta marina. It was independently described again in 1879 as Desis robsoni. In 1880, Octavius Pickard-Cambridge transferred A. marina to the Robsonia genus. In 1895, Robsonia marina was transferred to the Desis genus as Desis marinus. However, Desis is feminine, so the name was corrected to Desis marina. D. marina was redescribed in 1970 and 1990.

Description
Its chelicerae are proportionally large. This species is notable for its complex branched tracheal systems and its adaptations to a marine environment.

Distribution and habitat
Desis marina can be found in New Zealand (Including the Chatham Islands) and New Caledonia. This species is found in rocky shore intertidal zones. It builds silk retreats in seashells, tubeworm burrows, and bull kelp holdfasts, which it seals shut after entering. In these environments, the spiders and their silk retreats are regularly submerged in sea water. D. marina is nocturnal.

Diet 
This species is known to emerge and feed during low tide, eating amphipods, marine isopods and other small invertebrates.

Physiology 
When in their silk retreats, Desis marina may be submerged for up to 19 days. To aid in surviving this long underwater, D. marina has a lower respiration rate than other spiders of similar size, which enables it to survive on the small amount of air in its retreat.

Life history 
Desis marina reproduce yearly. Eggs are laid in the females retreat from September to January, with a recruitment period between March and April. All spiders are hatched by May. Egg development takes roughly two months and juveniles remain in the females retreat for another two months (The time required for the first two instars to develop). It takes juveniles roughly 4-5 months of reach maturity. Females can potentially live for up to two years, so may be able to reproduce a second clutch of eggs.

References

External links

Itis report

Desidae
Spiders of New Zealand
Spiders described in 1878